The Salt Lake Temple is a temple of the Church of Jesus Christ of Latter-day Saints on Temple Square in Salt Lake City, Utah, United States. At , it is the largest Latter-day Saint temple by floor area. Dedicated in 1893, it is the sixth temple completed by the church, requiring 40 years to complete, and the fourth temple built since the Mormon exodus from Nauvoo, Illinois, in 1846. The temple was closed in December 2019 for a general remodelling and seismic renovations that are anticipated to take approximately four years.

Details

The Salt Lake Temple is the centerpiece of the  Temple Square in Salt Lake City, Utah. Like other Latter-day Saint temples, the church and its members consider it sacred and a temple recommend is required to enter, so there are no public tours inside the temple as there are for other adjacent buildings on Temple Square. In 1912, the first public photographs of the interior were published in the book The House of the Lord, by James E. Talmage.  Since then, various photographs have been published, including by Life magazine in 1938. The temple grounds are open to the public and are a popular tourist attraction. Due to its location at church headquarters and its historical significance, Latter-day Saints from around the world patronize the temple.

The Salt Lake Temple is also the location of the weekly meetings of the First Presidency and the Quorum of the Twelve Apostles. As such, there are special meeting rooms in the building for these purposes, including the Holy of Holies, which are not part of other temples.

The temple includes some elements thought to evoke Solomon's Temple at Jerusalem. It is oriented towards Jerusalem and the large basin used as a baptismal font is mounted on the backs of twelve oxen, as was the Molten Sea in Solomon's Temple (see Chronicles 4:2–4). (However, the literal interpretation of the Biblical verses has been disputed.) At the east end of the building, the height of the center pinnacle to the base of the angel Moroni is 210 feet.

Location
The temple is in downtown Salt Lake City, with several mountain peaks close by. Nearby, a shallow stream, City Creek, splits and flows both to the west and to the south, flowing into the Jordan River. There is a wall around the  temple site. The surrounding wall became the first permanent structure on what has become known as Temple Square. The wall is a uniform 15 feet high but varies in appearance because of the site's southwest slope.

Uses
The temple is considered the house of God and is reserved for special ceremonies for practicing Latter-Day Saints. The main ordinance rooms are used during the endowment ceremony—namely the creation, garden, telestial, terrestrial, and celestial rooms in that order of use. A washing and anointing ceremony is also administered, and until 1921, the rooms were also used for healing rituals of washing and anointing for the sick or pregnant and were administered by women and men. The temple also serves as a place for marriage sealing ceremonies for live and deceased persons. Additional uses include functioning as a location for baptisms for the dead, baptisms for health (until being discontinued in 1921), and, briefly, for re-baptism for the renewal of covenants. Other rituals performed in the temple include the second anointing ordinance for live and deceased persons, and meeting rooms for church leaders.

Temple construction and dedication

The temple's location was first marked by Brigham Young, the church's second president, on July 28, 1847, just four days after he arrived in the Salt Lake Valley. In 1901, church apostle Anthon H. Lund recorded in his journal that "it is said" that Oliver Cowdery's divining rod was used to locate the temple site.  The temple site was dedicated on February 14, 1853, by Heber C. Kimball. Groundbreaking ceremonies were presided over by Young, who laid the cornerstone on April 6 of that year. The architect was Truman O. Angell, and the temple features both Gothic and Romanesque elements.

Sandstone was originally used for the foundation. During the Utah War, the foundation was buried and the lot made to look like a plowed field to prevent unwanted attention from federal troops. After tensions eased in 1858 and work on the temple resumed, it was discovered that many of the foundation stones had cracked, making them unsuitable for use. Although not all of the sandstone was replaced, the inadequate sandstone was replaced. The walls are quartz monzonite (which has the appearance of granite) from Little Cottonwood Canyon, twenty miles (32 km) southeast of the temple site. Oxen transported the quarried rock initially, but as the Transcontinental Railroad neared completion in 1869 the remaining stones were carried by rail at a much faster rate.

During the construction, the temple grounds were seized by the U.S. marshal as a result of the Edmunds-Tucker Act of 1886. It was later returned to the Latter-day Saints.

The capstone—the granite sphere that holds the statue of the Angel Moroni—was laid on April 6, 1892, by means of an electric motor and switch operated by Wilford Woodruff, the church's fourth president, thus completing work on the temple's exterior. At the capstone ceremony, Woodruff proposed the building's interior be finished within one year, which would allow the temple to be dedicated forty years, to the day, after its commencement. John R. Winder was instrumental in overseeing the interior's completion on schedule; he would serve as a member of the temple presidency until his death in 1910. Woodruff dedicated the temple on April 6, 1893, exactly forty years after the cornerstone was laid.

2019 to 2025 renovation 

At the end of 2019, the temple was closed for a seismic retrofitting designed to allow it to withstand a magnitude 7.3 earthquake, the strongest expected magnitude in the Salt Lake Valley; work is expected to take about four years. Other facilities on Temple Square (and certain parts of the main temple) were to be demolished, reconstructed, and modernized in line with seismic code.
Mechanical, electrical, and plumbing systems will be replaced, Initially the interior and its historical artifacts were planned to be preserved (although plans were later changed and many historic elements were removed) and plazas and landscaping modified. Visitor access and tourism would remain during the entire renovation process, but in regulated and coordinated fashion.

Prior to 2019, the building had never been decommissioned for renovation and only minor updating of finishes and systems had occurred within the temple proper (although multiple "annex" additions had been added and removed in the past). This meant the temple's core historic architecture, layout, and workmanship had been preserved for 126 years.

Before construction started, church leaders indicated that the temple's unique historicity would be preserved. Church employees stated that special efforts would be made to highlight and honor the pioneer craftsmanship and indicated the interiors would essentially remain the same. Various renderings were released showing the instruction rooms used for the endowment ceremony would remain intact, with the original layout, woodwork and murals being preserved.

In March 2021, the church announced significant changes to the renovation plan that affected many elements in the temple's historic interior. The progressive room-to-room live endowment ceremony would be removed and the layout of the temple would change, with the baptistry being moved to the annex and new instruction rooms constructed in its place. Other rooms and walls would be reconfigured, requiring the removal of the temple's murals. The murals and many other historic features of the building were photographed and otherwise documented before being permanently removed or destroyed.  In December 2021, the church announced that renovations were expected to conclude in 2025.

These changes will allow for greater patron capacity, but the removal of many historic elements was met with criticism, especially the destruction of the temple's murals. One prominent historian described the changes as a “huge and unnecessary loss” and another noted them as a loss of “priceless cultural artifacts.”

Symbolism

The Salt Lake Temple incorporates many symbolic adornments including Masonic symbols. Symbolism is an important subject to members of the LDS Church. These symbols include the following:

 All-seeing eye – The center tower on each side has a depiction of the all-seeing eye of God representing how God sees all things.

 Angel statue – The golden Angel Moroni statue, by sculptor Cyrus E. Dallin, tops the capstone of the temple. It symbolizes the angel mentioned in  that will come to welcome in the Second Coming of Christ. Early architectural plans showed two horizontally flying angels and the earliest references to the Salt Lake Temple's angel were always Gabriel. The original blueprint drawings intended the angel to be wearing temple ceremonial clothing like the angel on the Nauvoo Temple, but Paris-trained sculptor Dallin's 12.5-foot statue wears a crown instead of a temple cap that included a bright light which created a halo effect at night. As a result of an earthquake on March 18, 2020, the statue's trumpet broke.
 Beehive – The beehive symbol (which appears on the Utah state seal) appears on external doors and doorknobs and symbolizes the thrift, industry, perseverance, and order of the Mormon people.
 Big Dipper – On the west side of the temple the Big Dipper appears, which represents how the priesthood can help people find their way to heaven as the constellation helped travelers find the North Star. The uppermost stars on the temple's constellation align with the actual North Star.
 Compass and square – Early plan drawings of the temple show the Masonic arrangements of a compass and square placed around the second and fourth floor windows, but the plans were changed during construction. These symbols had appeared on the Nauvoo Temple weathervane.
 Clasped hands – Above each external door and doorknob appears the "hand clasp," which is a representation of covenants that are made within temples or brotherly love.
 Clouds – On the east side of the temple are "clouds raining down" representing the way God has continued revelation and still speaks to man "like the rains out of Heaven" or alternatively a veil of ignorance or sin.
 Earths – The Earthstones in the lower buttresses have been interpreted as the gospel of Christ spreading over the whole Earth.

 Saturns – Early drawings and a written description by Angell showed Saturnstones along the top tier of the temple, though the design was changed years later.
 Spires – The six spires of the temple represent the power of the priesthood. The three spires on the east side are a little higher than those on the west: they represent the Melchizedek, or "higher priesthood", and the Aaronic, or "preparatory priesthood" respectively. The three spires on the east side represent the church's First Presidency and the twelve smaller spires on those three represent the Twelve Apostles.
 Sun, moon, and stars – Around the temple there are several carved stones depicting the Sun, Moon, and stars which correspond respectively to the celestial, terrestrial, and telestial kingdoms of glory in the afterlife. The sunstones have also been interpreted to represent God, the moonstones in different phases as representing different phases of life, and the starstones representing Jesus Christ. These symbols were drawn from the three lesser lights symbols in the Freemasonry practiced by many early church leaders in Nauvoo. Additionally, five-pointed stars have traditionally represented the five wounds of Christ (hands, feet, and side) and the five-pointed star with an elongated downward ray found on several LDS temples has been interpreted to represent Christ coming to Earth.

Incidents

Bombings
Two bombing incidents have damaged the temple. On April 10, 1910, a bomb at the nearby Hotel Utah (now the Joseph Smith Memorial Building) damaged the trumpet of the Moroni statue atop the temple. On November 14, 1962, the southeast door of the Salt Lake Temple was bombed. FBI agents state that the explosive had been wrapped around the door handles on the temple's southeast entrance. The large wooden entrance doors were damaged by flying fragments of metal and glass. Damage to interior walls occurred 25 feet inside the temple, but damage to the interior was minor.  Eleven exterior windows were shattered.

1999 Salt Lake City tornado

The temple suffered damage in 1999 when a tornado rated F2 on the Fujita Scale struck Salt Lake City. A wedding taking place at the time allowed a photographer to record video of the tornado as it passed near the temple, forcing the wedding party to shelter against the temple doors and pillars for protection from the wind and debris. They were not allowed inside to take shelter as the temple doors were locked. After being pelted with rain and hail, members of the wedding party surveyed the damage to the trees and surrounding buildings before resuming the ceremony.

2020 Salt Lake City earthquake

On the morning of March 18, 2020, a magnitude 5.7 earthquake struck just outside Salt Lake City. Though most of the damage was outside the city, minor damage was inflicted on the temple. The trumpet of the Angel Moroni on top of the temple's tallest spire was dislodged from the statue, and some stones from the smaller spires were displaced. No other damage to the temple was reported.

Interior images

Below are several photographs from the interior of the temple. In response to a member obtaining unauthorized images of the interior of the temple, church leaders decided to release the book The House of the Lord in 1912, which contained authorized black-and-white photographs of the interior, some of which are shown below. The unauthorized photographs had been taken over several months the year before by a man who was repeatedly allowed to enter with his camera while the temple was closed by a temple gardener friend.

Images of former interior elements
Below are some elements of the temple have been removed during various renovations of the temple.

Temple presidents

 Lorenzo Snow, 1893–1898
 Joseph F. Smith, 1898–1911
 Anthon H. Lund, 1911–1921
 George F. Richards, 1921–1938
 Stephen L. Chipman, 1938–1945
 Joseph Fielding Smith, 1945–1949
 Robert D. Young, 1949–1953
 ElRay L. Christiansen, 1953–1961
 Willard E. Smith, 1961–1964
 Howard S. McDonald, 1964–1968
 O. Leslie Stone, 1968–1972
 John K. Edmunds, 1972–1977
 A. Ray Curtis, 1977–1982
 Marion D. Hanks, 1982–1985
 Victor L. Brown, 1985–1987
 Edgar M. Denny, 1987–1990
 Spencer H. Osborn, 1990–1993
 George I. Cannon, 1993–1996
 Carlos E. Asay, 1996–1999
 Derrill H. Richards, 1999
 W. Eugene Hansen, 1999–2002
 L. Aldin Porter, 2002–2005
 M. Richard Walker, 2005–2008
 Sheldon F. Child, 2008–2011
 Oren Claron Alldredge Jr., 2011–2014
 Cecil O. Samuelson, 2014–2017
 B. Jackson Wixom, 2017–2019

See also

 List of temples of The Church of Jesus Christ of Latter-day Saints
 List of temples of The Church of Jesus Christ of Latter-day Saints by geographic region
 Temple architecture (Latter-day Saints)
 The Church of Jesus Christ of Latter-day Saints in Utah
 The Mountain of the Lord

References

Further reading

External links

 
 All Wiki images categorized under Salt Lake Temple
 Official Salt Lake Temple page
 Inside The Salt Lake City Temple - a pictorial tour of the temple interior at Moroni10.com
 

19th-century Latter Day Saint temples
Religious buildings and structures in Salt Lake City
Churches completed in 1893
Temple Square
Temples (LDS Church) in Utah
Tourist attractions in Salt Lake City
1893 establishments in Utah Territory
Historic American Buildings Survey in Utah